National Unification Party (Partido Unificación Nacional) was a political party in Costa Rica from 1966 to 1978. It was founded by Rafael Ángel Calderón Guardia and Otilio Ulate Blanco, and espoused social welfare and a free market.

The party, was formed in reaction to the post civil war success of the National Liberation Party. It was formed from the old National Republican Party, led by former president Rafael Ángel Calderón Guardia and the National Union Party, headed by former president Otilio Ulate Blanco, joined by a few minor parties. Calderón Guardia quickly took control of the party. The party was highly personalist, and sometimes the party was referred to as the Calderonistas.

In the 1966 general elections, they won the presidency with José Joaquín Trejos Fernández, but were just shy of a majority in the Legislative Assembly winning 26 seats.  In the 1970 elections they ran former president Mario Echandi Jiménez, but lost the presidency due to the return of the hero of the civil war, José Figueres Ferrer, nevertheless they managed to hold on to 22 seats in the Legislative Assembly. The death of Rafael Ángel Calderón Guardia in 1970 weakened the party, even though his brother Francisco Calderón Guardia then took control.  In the 1974 elections they ran Fernando Trejos Escalante for president, but he was easily defeated by Daniel Oduber Quirós, and altogether they won only 16 seats in the Legislative Assembly. Francisco Calderón Guardia died in 1977 which was the death knell for the party.  Most of the original coalition left the party, including the Republicans and the National Union Party. The National Unification Party's last gasp was the 1978 elections where they ran Guillermo Villalobos Arce for president, but he lost and the party took no seats in the Legislative Assembly. The National Unification Party had already been replaced by the temporary Unity Coalition, which metamorphosed into the Social Christian Unity Party.

Notes

External links
Costa Rican Assembly members 1966-1978 for the National Unification Party Official Costa Rican Assembly website, last accessed 1 December 2008, in Spanish

Defunct political parties in Costa Rica